Estonian horse may refer to:

 The Estonian Draft, an Estonian breed of draught horse
 The Estonian Native, an Estonian breed of small horse
 The Tori horse, an Estonian breed of harness horse